The KPHL National Soccer League, also known as the Kumul Petroleum Holdings Limited National Soccer League for sponsorship reasons, is the men's top division of professional soccer in Papua New Guinea. It is a nationwide league formed in 2006 by Papua New Guinea Football Association.

It replaced the Papua New Guinea National Club Championship as the country's major soccer competition.

In its 13 seasons, the competition has been won by only two clubs: Hekari United won the first eight editions, while Lae City have won the last six. The two clubs have met in two Grand Finals, in 2015–16 and 2019, with Lae City winning both.

History

Foundation 
The National Soccer League was started by David Chung, the President of the Papua New Guinea Football Association (PNGFA), in 2006. It was the first nationwide semi-professional football league, and a step up from the amateur Papua New Guinea National Club Championship, which had been in existence since 1976.

In the first season, which took place in late 2006, the league took place alongside the amateur league, with the winners of each league (i.e. the semi-professional and amateur champions) playing each other in a two-legged playoff to decide that year's qualifier for the OFC Champions League. Since then, the winner (and more recently, the runner-up) of the National Soccer League has earned qualification each year for the OFC Champions League.

Since its inception, with the exception of the 2015–16 season, the league has consisted of an initial league phase, with each team playing each other twice, before the top four teams enter a knockout Championship playoff, with the eventual league champion decided in a one-legged Grand Final.

2006–2012: Early years 
The first eight editions of the competition were won by Hekari United, under different names.

In 2006, five teams entered the competition from five different provinces: Port Moresby (PRK Souths United, now Hekari United), Lae (TL Blue Kumuls), Central Province (Gelle Hills), Madang (Madang Flying Fox) and Mount Hagen (Welgris Momads). A sixth side, to come from Lae, Kimbe or Bougainville, eventually did not enter. PRK Souths United won, defeating Gelle Hills 2–0 in the Grand Final. However, they failed to qualify for the OFC Champions League after a 4–2 aggregate defeat to amateur side University Inter in the Overall Final.

The 2007–08 season was played in late 2007 and early 2008, and became known as the Telikom NSL Cup, due to sponsorship reasons. All five of the founding members of the league entered once again, albeit under various different names: TL Blue Kumuls became Morobe FC; Welgris Momads became Welgris Highlanders; PRK Souths United became Hekari United; and Madang Flying Fox became simply Madang Fox. Furthermore, two new teams entered, Rapatona FC and Besta Madang. The top four teams in the regular season table qualified for the Championship playoffs, with Hekari United finishing top of the regular season table and defeating Gelle Hills in the final again.

In the 2008–09 season, the league was expanded to eight teams, albeit with three sides from the previous season not taking part. Madang Fox and Besta Madang withdrew, while Gelle Hills application was rejected in favour of new club Sepik FC. Also joining the league were Eastern Stars, Nabasa United and University Inter, who had beaten Hekari United in the 2006 Overall Final. Hekari and Inter were first and second in the regular season table, but it was Hekari and Rapatona who were due to meet in the Grand Final; however, following two postponements on 21 March and 28 March, the PNGFA awarded the championship, and qualification to the OFC Champions League, to Hekari United, by virtue of their higher league position.

The 2009–10 season saw the league expanded once again, to encapsulate nine teams. Sepik FC withdrew after failing to submit a letter of interest, while Welgris Highlanders missed the application deadline. Nabasa United also withdrew, while Gelle Hills and Madang Fox were reinstated. There were new entries from Tukoko University FC and Besta PNG United, the latter of which acted as the national U-20 squad. Hekari United again finished top of the regular season table, and played Gigira Laitepo in the Grand Final, winning 5–0.

For the first time since its inception, the number of teams decreased ahead of the 2010–11 season, with Gelle Hills, Rapatona FC and University Inter all withdrawing, while Petro Souths FC joined the league for the first time. That left seven sides taking part, with Hekari finishing the season unbeaten and top of the league, defeating Eastern Stars 4–0 in the final.

The 2011–12 season saw relative stability within the league, with only one side (Madang Fox) withdrawing, being replaced by new entrants Bulolo United. Hekari United once again finished top of the regular season table, and played Eastern Stars in the Grand Final for the second consecutive season, winning 3–0.

In July 2012, PNGFA President and league founder David Chung was named as a recipient of the Order of the British Empire in the Queen’s Birthday Honours list.

2013–2016: Difficulties and disillusionment 
2013 saw a delay in the start date of the league due mainly to late registrations leading to a lack of sufficient number of teams for the competition. By late December 2012, only four teams had completed the registration process: current champions Hekari United, Besta United PNG, Welgris Highlanders, returning from a three-year absence, and newcomers West New Britain Tavur. Another new franchise, FC Port Moresby, joined in early January. At this stage, the NSL had decided to go ahead with the league with just six teams, the lowest since the inaugural season, but two sides, founding members Morobe FC and NC Civil Works Oro FC, submitted their registration documents on the same day, leaving the organisers with a dilemma. This led to Hekari United's owner, John Kappi Natto, urging the NSL to re-adjust the league to cater for all seven teams. It was only on 29 January that the teams were confirmed, over two months later than usual, with the addition of Eastern Stars creating an eight-team league for the season ahead.

The NSL board took further criticism early in the season from new side WNB Tavur. The NSL contractually paid for the travel costs for all clubs, but due to Tavur's location on the New Guinea islands, were unwilling to cover the more expensive travel costs involved. This led to Tavur playing three consecutive away matches, on 20, 23 and 28 February 2013, to avoid back and forth travel costs. Eventually, however, the season concluded on 1 June, with Hekari United claiming their seventh consecutive title, winning 3–0 against FC Port Moresby in the Grand Final.

The 2014 season initially had 12 interested clubs, but by 21 October, only seven of them had completed the registration process in full, including new sides Admiralty FC and Lae FC. The previous season's finalists FC Port Moresby had not done so, and neither had last year's debutants WNB Tavur. Both clubs ended up being excluded from the competition, with FC Port Moresby eventually lodging an appeal and submitting a case to the court. This led to another season-start delay, with the start date being postponed three times before eventually starting on 8 February, after FC Port Moresby withdrew their court case 'for the sake of the 2014 football season'.

In April 2014, Morobe FC's owner Tuguyawini Libe Parindali accused the National Soccer League of being too expensive', claiming that there was 'no incentive to keep competing in the division. This was in response to the NSL's decision to stop subsidising airfares, accommodation, food and transport for away games, something they had done since the inception of the league in 2006.

On the pitch, Hekari United were awarded their eighth consecutive league title on 24 May 2014, despite the Grand Final being abandoned after 70 minutes due to crowd violence. With Hekari leading 3–0, several Lae FC fans outside the arena fence started throwing stones at the Hekari United players, with Hekari goalkeeper Godfrey Baniau being hit several times. Some claimed that the referee was biased towards Hekari United, with the decision to send off Lae captain Kohu Liem causing the fan outrage, while others blamed the organisers, who failed to clear supporters who had not paid for the event away from the stadium.

Ahead of the 2015 season, Gigira Laitepo, who had sponsored Morobe FC for the entirety of their eight-year league history, withdrew their sponsorship, throwing the franchise into disarray. The club ended up withdrawing from the league, as did Eastern Stars and Lae FC. Toti City F.C., a new franchise under similar management to the previous year's runners-up, took the place of Lae, while FC Port Moresby returned after their long court saga the previous year, as did Madang FC after a three-year absence.

The season became the first in history that Hekari United didn't win the title: the eight-time champions were beaten by Madang FC in the semi-finals of the playoffs, despite finishing the regular season top of the table. Madang went on to lose 5–1 to Toti City in the final, with the Lae club winning the title after just two years of existence.

The 2015-16 season saw unprecedented interest, with 12 clubs successfully signing up, and the organisers taking a decision to split the division into two zones, northern and southern. New clubs included PS Huawei, Erema FC, Goroka Gosiha and Rapatona FC, the latter of whom was returning to the competition after a five-year absence under new sponsorship for the 2015–16 season. Morobe FC, now under the sponsorship of Welgris, also returned, and a new club was formed under new sponsorship from the Gigira Laitepo company. The league ran smoothly, with the top two teams from each zone entering a second group stage, and the top two teams facing off once again in the final. For the second season in a row, Toti City won the title, ahead of Hekari United, winning 2–0.

2017–2018: League split 
Towards the end of 2016, several cumulative events triggered many clubs across Papua New Guinea to split from the PNGFA-organised and FIFA-accredited National Soccer League, eventually forming a rival association, the Football Federation Papua New Guinea (FFPNG).

During the lead-up to the delayed election of the PNGFA president in December 2016, Hekari United President John Kapi Natto, who at the time was one of three contenders for the presidency, was suspended for 'non-compliance to the FIFA electoral code.' Kapi Natto expressed his frustration at the decision, which came just three weeks before the election, and also claimed that the election was deferred from August to December because incumbent, David Chung, didn't have the numbers to support his re-election. Former acting general secretary of the PNGFA, Noel Mobiha, later condemned the decision, saying it 'was not in the best interests of soccer in the country.' On 29 December 2016, Chung was re-elected as president of the association. The following day, Kapi Natto declared that Hekari United, along with 11 of the 18 other associations affiliated with the PNGFA, would be pulling out of the upcoming National Soccer League season.

On 2 February 2017, Hekari United were disqualified from the 2017 OFC Champions League after the PNGFA filed a formal complaint against the club and Kapi Natto. The ruling claimed that by making 'numerous derogatory public statements regarding the PNGFA', as well as several players failing to report for international duty, the club had 'engaged in behaviour that damaged the integrity of football.' Despite this, NSL competition manager Simon Koima maintained that Hekari's participation in the 2017 National Soccer League was still possible, but on 27 February, Kapi Natto launched the Football Federation Papua New Guinea and its flagship competition, the National Premier League.

The 2017 National Soccer League kicked off in May, with only 4 of the 12 clubs from the previous season remaining: Lae City Dwellers, Madang FC, PS Huawei and Besta PNG United. New sides included Buang FC and Southern Strikers.

The season was riddled with difficulties, beginning with new side Southern Strikers withdrawing without playing a match. They were replaced by Vitis Yamaros FC. After several deferred and even cancelled matches, the season was set to conclude with the playoffs in August, despite tense political developments in certain areas of the country due to the national election. However, PS Huawei disbanded before their rearranged playoff semi-final, citing poor management of the competition, while the NSL itself cancelled the Grand Final, which would have been between Lae City Dwellers and Madang FC, blaming 'the rainy season in Lae, the national elections and the failure of some clubs to pay their fees in full'. Lae City Dwellers were declared champions, having maintained the best regular season record.

The 2018 season was completed in slightly smoother fashion than the previous one, with Southern Strikers successfully replacing Vitis Yamaros FC, while all four other clubs (aside from disbanded PS Huawei) remained in the division, alongside new sides FC Morobe Wawens and FC Momase. Lae City Dwellers were renamed Toti City Dwellers for sponsorship reasons. That said, the season was not without its difficulties. In early January, shortly after the season began, the PNGFA were banned from using all PNG Sports Foundation facilities due to outstanding payments from the 2016 FIFA U-20 Women's World Cup, which took place in the country. On May 3, it was decided that all the remaining matches were to be forfeited, as only four sides – Toti City, Besta PNG Utd, Morobe Wawens and Madang – had paid their affiliation fee in full. However, by the following week, Southern Strikers settled their fee, and their remaining matches were rescheduled, while Buang and Momase had 0–3 defeats awarded against them in all their outstanding fixtures.

Following investigations into corruption, David Chung stepped down from his roles as OFC President, PNGFA President and on the FIFA Council on 6 April 2018, citing personal reasons. Shortly thereafter, members of both the PNGFA and the FFPNG agreed to hold talks regarding the league split and other issues surrounding the sport in the country.

Meanwhile, in the Grand Final, Toti City Dwellers defeated Besta PNG United 3–0 in the Grand Final on 26 May 2018 to win their fourth straight title.

2019–present: League reunification 
On 27 October 2018, after over 18 months of division within the sport domestically, the two rival bodies, the PNGFA and the FFPNG reunited, with John Kapi Natto becoming the new president of the PNGFA.

Plans for the 2019 season were announced in November 2018, with the expectation that the league would be played in four separate regions: Southern (Papua), Northern (Momase), Highlands and Islands. The competition kicked off on 26 January 2019, with a record 27 teams taking part across all four regions of the country.

The regular season began without many problems, however as the season progressed, certain issues began to arise and were aired in the local media outlets. On 30 March, Laiwaden FC goalkeeper Mikes Gewa was kicked in the ribs by Morobe Wawens' Jason Farrock, and the player was hospitalised. The player died just under a month later in hospital. It was then revealed that the National Soccer League hadn't taken out medical insurance to cover its players, continuing that it would likely be the case for the following season, and that both the NSL and the clubs taking part had overlooked the issue and should share the blame.

Aside from medical issues, the regional regular season finished relatively smoothly, but the format of the playoffs caused some controversy amongst players, coaches and fans alike, mainly because teams from the same regional division were not kept apart until the final, meaning it was impossible for two sides from the same conference to meet in the final and secure continental qualification. Furthermore, the format was changed twice within a month, leading Eastern Stars' chairman Joseph Ealedona to describe it as 'fraud at the highest level'. PNGFA chairman Kapi Natto responded to the criticism by distancing the association, which only gives advice on how the competition should be run, from the management of the NSL itself, and stating that he believed the draws were done 'after taking into consideration the costs involved.

Nevertheless, the playoffs continued as planned, and the two previous champions, Hekari United and Toti City, ended up meeting in the Grand Final. Following a goalless scoreline after 120 minutes, Toti City won their fifth consecutive title, winning 5–4 on penalties.

The start of the 2019–20 season was delayed several times, having originally planned an expansion to include a two-tier system, with a national Premier Division and a regional Conference Competition. However, lack of interest eventually led to the cancellation of the Conference Division, and a ten-team competition was announced on 10 December 2019, to start on 14 December. The season was completed without much controversy, despite an enforced five-month break due to the COVID-19 pandemic, with Lae City picking up their sixth title after a 1–0 victory over Vitiaz United in the Grand Final.

2019–20 clubs

Top three list 

Notes:

 Final not played, championship (and third-place) awarded to best regular season team.
 Match abandoned after 70 minutes.
(*) Third place determined by league position in 'National Champions League.'
&& The only information disponible about 2022 edition is on 2023 OFC champions league's wikipedia page

List by team

Top scorers

References

External links
League at FIFA
League at soccerway.com

 
Football leagues in Papua New Guinea
Top level football leagues in Oceania
Sports leagues established in 2006
2006 establishments in Papua New Guinea